The 2004 Furman Paladins football team represented the Furman University as a member of the Southern Conference (SoCon) during the 2004 NCAA Division I-AA football season. Led by third-year head coach Bobby Lamb, the Paladins compiled an overall record of 10–3 with a mark of 6–1 in conference play, sharing the SoCon title with Georgia Southern. Furman advanced to the NCAA Division I-AA Football Championship playoffs, where they beat Jacksonville State in the first round before losing to the eventual national champion, James Madison, in the quarterfinals.

Schedule

References

Furman
Furman Paladins football seasons
Southern Conference football champion seasons
Furman Paladins football